Listikot is a village in Sindhupalchok District in the Bagmati Zone of central Nepal. At the time of the 1991 Nepal census it had a population of 3664 and had 714 houses in the village.

References

Its surrounded by kaverepalnchhok, ramechap, rasuwa and china on north, most of the people are agriculture and some are business. Most of the population are Sherpa family and most of the population from Buddhism religion.
VDC ward # are as below,
1.	Kanglang
2.	Darapani
3.	Changshing
4.	Gumba
5.	Valdong
6.      Listi
7.	Chhagam
8.	Bagham
9.	Ghipche

Populated places in Sindhupalchowk District